Erin Murray Quinlan is an American writer and composer for theatre, most notably God Save Queen Pam which debuted Off-Broadway at the Players Theatre in 2018 and was published by Roger Bean and Steele Spring Stage Rights in 2019.

Education 

Quinlan graduated from Berklee College of Music in 2009. She also studied composition at Philip Lasser's EAMA Nadia Boulanger Institute with Michel Merlet. She is an alumna of the BMI Lehmen Engel Musical Theatre Workshop.

Career 

Quinlan's musical about Ernest Hemingway and his four marriages, Hemingway's Wife, was produced at the Players Ring in 2015. It received mixed reviews. That year, Quinlan also wrote music and lyrics and co-wrote the script (with Larry Tish and Lee Goodwin) to Jews on First, a trunk show about Jewish baseball players commissioned by Larry Ruttman, using stories from his book, American Jews and America's Game.  Its NYC premiere was at the American Jewish Historical Society in 2016. She also co-wrote lyrics and wrote the music to "How Can I Tell You" on Rory Sherman's album MS. A Song Cycle, which benefitted the MS Society UK and included compositions from Bree Lowdermilk, George Macguire, Robert J. Sherman, George Stiles, and Sarah Travis. It was sung by West End star Julie Atherton.

In 2018, God Save Queen Pam had its Off-Broadway debut at the Players Theatre, to which Quinlan wrote the music, lyrics, and book. It opened to generally positive reviews, holding a 75 rating on Show-Score. It was published  by Roger Bean and Steele Spring Stage Rights in 2019.

In 2020, Quinlan wrote the score to the film Bad Cupid starring John Rhys Davis.

References 

American women dramatists and playwrights
21st-century American composers
Year of birth missing (living people)
Living people
Berklee College of Music alumni
21st-century American women